Putao may refer to:

China
Putao, Guangxi, a town in Yangshuo County, Guangxi Zhuang Autonomous Region
Putao, Xinjiang, a town in Turpan, Xinjiang Uyghur Autonomous Region

Myanmar
Putao District, a district of Kachin State
Putao Township, in Putao District
Putao Town, Kachin State, in Putao Township